Mahadevan Vellupillai Balakrishnan (born 3 March 1941 – died 14 January 2017 as එම්. වී. බාලන්) [Sinhala]), popularly as M. V. Balan, was an actor in Sri Lankan cinema. Career spanned for more than four decades, Balan has worked as a film production manager, assistant director, choreographer and a filmmaker.

Personal life
Balan was born on 3 March 1941 (Sarasaviya recorded the birth date as 15 March 1940) in Ganepalla village, Yatiyanthota. Balan was married to a Sinhala woman Chandrawathi Hesarasinghe and the couple has two children.

He died on 14 January 2017 at the age of 75. His remains are kept at the 8th floor of the Mount Lavinia housing scheme, Kalmdemulla Road, Golumudama Junction, Ratmalana until 3.00 pm. The funeral took place on 16 January 2017 at 4.00 pm at the Mount Lavinia General Cemetery.

Career
He joined Ceylon Studios as a technician in 1958 and was first involved as a lighting artist in the film Sihanaya.

He made his acting debut in 1958 film Wanaliya with a minor role. Then he appeared in many dramatic and comedy roles including Wanaliya, Pirimiyek Nisa, Suvineetha Lalani, Ganthera, Sasaraka Hati and Cheriyo Captain. Balan worked as the choreographer in many popular films such as Sithaka Mahima, Ipadune Ai, London Hamu and Okkoma Hari. His acting in the film Nomiyena Minisun with Gamini Fonseka was a memorable feat in his career. His role as a servant was highly appreciated by critics.

He has directed 11 films in Sinhala cinema started with Oba Nathinam in 1969. In 1975, Balan directed the film Hitha Honda Minihek starred by Gamini Fonseka. In 1978, he was the producer of film Mage Ran Putha. He also directed popular films Rahasak Nathi Rahasak and Deviyani Sathya Surakinna. Apart from Sinhala films, Balan also directed several Sri Lankan Tamil films such as Manjal Kunkumam and Nirmala.

Filmography

As actor

As director

References

External links

1941 births
2017 deaths
Sri Lankan male film actors
Sri Lankan film directors
Sri Lankan film producers